was a  after Kagen and before Enkyō. This period spanned the years from December 1306 through October 1308.

Change of era
 1306 : The new era name was created to mark an event or series of events. The previous era ended and the new one commenced in Kagen

 4.

Events of the Tokuji era
 1308 (Tokuji 3, 8th month): In the 8th year of Go-Nijo-tennōs reign (後二条天皇8年), the emperor died at the young age of 24; and the succession (senso) was received by his cousin. Shortly thereafter, Emperor Hanazono is said to have acceded to the throne (sokui).
 1308 (Tokuji 3, 10th month): The nengō was changed to Enkyō to mark the accession of Emperor Hanazono.

Notes

References
 Nussbaum, Louis-Frédéric and Käthe Roth. (2005).  Japan encyclopedia. Cambridge: Harvard University Press. ;  OCLC 58053128
 Titsingh, Isaac. (1834). Nihon Odai Ichiran; ou,  Annales des empereurs du Japon.  Paris: Royal Asiatic Society, Oriental Translation Fund of Great Britain and Ireland. OCLC 5850691
 Varley, H. Paul. (1980). A Chronicle of Gods and Sovereigns: Jinnō Shōtōki of Kitabatake Chikafusa. New York: Columbia University Press. ;  OCLC 6042764

External links
 National Diet Library, "The Japanese Calendar" -- historical overview plus illustrative images from library's collection

Japanese eras
1300s in Japan